known as Dragon Ball Z in Europe, is a 1993 fighting video game developed by Tose and published by Bandai for the Super Nintendo Entertainment System. It is based upon Akira Toriyama's Dragon Ball franchise, and was its first fighting game. Its gameplay consists of one-on-one fights, with a main six-button configuration, featuring special moves, as well as three playable modes.

Due to the popularity of Street Fighter II: The World Warrior at the time, producer Toshihiro Suzuki chose to work on a fighting game when assigned to a new project due to it being his preferred genre. Dragon Ball Z: Super Butōden garnered mostly positive reception from critics; most reviewers praised the presentation and gameplay but others felt divided in regards to several design aspects. The game sold approximately 1.3 million units in its first two months of release in Japan. 

Super Butōden would spawn several sequels; including Dragon Ball Z: Super Butōden 2 (1993), Dragon Ball Z: Super Butōden 3 (1994), Dragon Ball Z: Shin Butōden (1995), Dragon Ball Kai: Ultimate Butoden (2011), and Dragon Ball Z: Extreme Butōden (2015).

Gameplay 

Dragon Ball Z: Super Butōden is a fighting game similar to Street Fighter II. Players fight against other characters in one-on-one matches and the fighter who manages to deplete the health bar of the opponent wins the bout and becomes the winner of the match. The game features three modes of play, a roster of 12 playable characters and their respective transformations with five additional characters being unlockable via cheat code. Characters available are Goku, Piccolo, Vegeta, Frieza, Android 20, Android 18, Android 16, Cell, Trunks and Gohan.

Super Butōden uses a customizable six-button control scheme. Special moves are present in conventional format, with most commands consisting of button combinations. Characters can also dash back and forth by pressing L and R respectively. Players can also charge their Ki gauge by holding the Y and B buttons to unleash a Ki blast attack. Unique to the game is the split-screen feature; when one of the two combatants moves far away in the playfield, the view is split to keep both fighters shown in a single screen while their positioning is kept via an on-screen radar.

Development and release 
Dragon Ball Z: Super Butōden served as both the first full-fledged fighting game in the Dragon Ball franchise and the first entry in the Super Butōden sub-series. Its development was helmed by producer Toshihiro Suzuki, with Akihumi Kubota and Shinsaku Shimada serving as co-directors. Kinya Takehana and Koji Shimizu co-designed the game with additional design work by Design Office D&D while artists Hirokazu Tamai, Masayuki Takahashi, Seiichiro Shiino, Shinichi Iidawere and Shōko Arai were responsible for the pixel art, in addition to Maruko Papa and "Maruko" acting as programmers. Both music and sound design were handled by Kenji Yamamoto of Hyper Entertainment and Yuki Sabakuma respectively. Other people also assisted with its development. Due to the popularity of fighting games at the time such as Street Fighter II: The World Warrior, Suzuki stated he chose to work on a fighting game when assigned to a new project due to it being his favorite genre.

Dragon Ball Z: Super Butōden was first released by Bandai in Japan on March 20, 1993 and later in Europe on November 30 of the same year. On March 27, 1993, an album was published exclusively in Japan by Columbia, featuring arranged songs co-composed by Yamamoto, Ginji Ogawa and Sueaki Harada of Hyper Monolith. In Japan, a special glitter sticker with a hidden technique written on the back for the game was also distributed as an order bonus. In 2018, the title was included as a limited pre-order bonus for the Nintendo Switch version of Dragon Ball FighterZ, marking its first appearance in North American regions. On October of the same year, Bandai Namco Entertainment announced that the game would be unlocked for free to Switch users in Latin America if their official newsletter reached 10,000 subcribers.

Reception

Sales
Upon release in Japan, Dragon Ball Z: Super Butōden topped the Famitsu sales charts in March 1993. Two months after its release in Japan, the title recorded sales of 1.3 million units. It proved to be a commercial hit, with lifetime sales between 1.41 million and, according to Famitsu, 1.45 million units, in Japan alone.

Critical response
Dragon Ball Z: Super Butōden received mostly positive reception from critics. Famitsu praised the voice samples, the split-screen feature, ability to avoid special moves via button inputs and auto mode for newcomers. Fan reception was positive: readers of Famimaga voted to give the game a 23.08 out of 30 score, ranking at the number 46 spot in a poll, indicating a large popular following. Famimaga also gave it several awards for character and originality respectively.

Spirit, Laurent Defrance and François Hermellin of  praised the audiovisual presentation, playability and longevity. Olivier Prézeau, Grégoire Hellot and Laurent Deheppe of  commended the digitized sounds, aerial combat, character roster and sprite animations but criticized various aspects such as the visuals for being poor and the french translation. Super Pros Ryan Butt gave positive remarks to the graphics and sound, characters and their special moves, as well as regarding the split-screen effect to be novel but noted it could become cumbersome, while criticizing the gameplay for being repetitive. Super Actions Frank O'Connor gave a more negative outlook to the game, regarding it to be an "unplayable" Street Fighter II clone. Super Plays Matt Bielby gave positive comment to the graphics, cast of characters, originality and number of special moves but noted it to be "hard to access." Play Times Klaus Martin also commended the audiovisual presentation but felt mixed in regards to the gameplay. Super Controls Allison West and Paul Mallinson also felt mixed about the visuals, sound, gameplay and overall longevity. In contrast, Sylvain of  gave a very positive review of the title, giving it high remarks in multiple areas.

Spanish magazine Nintendo Acción gave very high remarks to the visuals, audio, gameplay and fun factor. Bruno Sol of  praised its faithfulness to the original manga, graphics, sound design and number of moves for each character, regarding it as one of the best arcade-style fighting games for Super Nintendo. Jeuxvideo.coms Rroyd-Y stated that "This first game in a successful trilogy is surely not the best episode of the three. Stained by a very heavy gameplay and a disconcerting difficulty, it will really only delight the unconditional fans of the time who seek at all costs to slip into the skin of Son Goku or Vegeta."

Notes

References

External links 

 Dragon Ball Z: Super Butōden at Giant Bomb
 Dragon Ball Z: Super Butōden at MobyGames

1993 video games
Bandai games
Dragon Ball games
Fighting games
Multiplayer and single-player video games
Split-screen multiplayer games
Super Nintendo Entertainment System games
Super Nintendo Entertainment System-only games
Tose (company) games
Video games developed in Japan
Video games scored by Kenji Yamamoto (composer, born 1958)